The Mathematical Association is a professional society concerned with mathematics education in the UK.

History
It was founded in 1871 as the Association for the Improvement of Geometrical Teaching and renamed to the Mathematical Association in 1894. It was the first teachers' subject organisation formed in England. In March 1927, it held a three-day meeting in Grantham to commemorate the bicentenary of the death of Sir Isaac Newton, attended by Sir J. J. Thomson (discoverer of the electron), Sir Frank Watson Dyson – the Astronomer Royal, Sir Horace Lamb, and G. H. Hardy.

In 1951, Mary Cartwright became the first female president of the Mathematical Association.

In the 1960s, when comprehensive education was being introduced, the Association was in favour of the 11-plus system. For maths teachers training at university, a teaching award that was examined was the Diploma of the Mathematical Association, later known as the Diploma in Mathematical Education of the Mathematical Association.

Function
It exists to "bring about improvements in the teaching of mathematics and its applications, and to provide a means of communication among students and teachers of mathematics". Since 1894 it has published The Mathematical Gazette. It is one of the participating bodies in the quadrennial British Congress of Mathematics Education, organised by the Joint Mathematical Council, and it holds its annual general meeting as part of the Congress.

Structure
It is based in the south-east of Leicester on London Road (A6), just south of the Charles Frears campus of De Montfort University.

Aside from the Council, it has seven other specialist committees.

Regions
Its branches are sometimes shared with the Association of Teachers of Mathematics (ATM):
 Birmingham
 Cambridge
 East Midlands
 Exeter
 Gloucester
 Liverpool
 London 
 Greater Manchester
 Meridian
 Stoke and Staffordshire
 Sheffield
 Sussex
 Yorkshire

Past presidents
Past presidents of The Association for the Improvement of Geometrical Teaching included: 
1871 Thomas Archer Hirst
1878 R B Hayward MA, FRS 
1889 Professor G M Minchin MA, FRS 
1891 James Joseph Sylvester
1892 The Reverend C Taylor DD 
1893 R Wormell MA, DSc 
1895 Joseph Larmor
 
Past presidents of The Mathematical Association have included:
1897 Alfred Lodge
1899–1900 Robert Stawell Ball
1901 John Fletcher Moulton, Baron Moulton
1903 Andrew Forsyth
1905 George Ballard Mathews
1907 George H. Bryan
1909–1910 Herbert Hall Turner
1911–1912 E. W. Hobson
1913–1914 Alfred George Greenhill
1915–1916 Alfred North Whitehead
1918–1919 Percy Nunn
1920 E. T. Whittaker
1921 James Wilson
1922–1923 Thomas Little Heath
1924–1925 G. H. Hardy
1926–1927 Micaiah John Muller Hill
1928–1929 William Fleetwood Sheppard
1930–1931 Arthur Eddington
1932–1933 G. N. Watson
1934 Eric Harold Neville
1935 A W Siddons
1936 Andrew Forsyth
1937 Louis Napoleon George Filon
1938 W Hope-Jones
1939 W C Fletcher
1944 C O Tuckey MA
1945 Sydney Chapman
1946 Warin Foster Bushell
1947 George Barker Jeffery
1948 Harold Spencer Jones 
1949 A Robson MA
1950 Professor H R Hasse MA, DSc
1951 Mary Cartwright
1952 K S Snell MA 
1953 Professor T A A Broadbent MA 
1954 W. V. D. Hodge
1955 G L Parsons MA
1956 George Frederick James Temple
1957 W J Langford JP, MSc 
1958 Max Newman
1959 Louise Doris Adams
1960 Edwin A. Maxwell
1961 J T Combridge MA, MSc
1962 Professor V C A Ferraro PhD, DIC
1963 J B Morgan MA 
1964 Ida Busbridge
1965 Elizabeth Williams
1966 F W Kellaway BSc 
1967 A.P. Rollett
1968 Charles Coulson
1969 Bertha Swirles
1970 James Lighthill
1971 B T Bellis MA, FRSE, FIMA
1972 C T Daltry BSc, FIMA 
1973 William McCrea
1974 Margaret Hayman
1975 Reuben Goodstein
1976 E Kerr BSc, PhD, FIMA, FBCS 
1977 Professor G Matthews MA, PhD, FIMA
1978 Alan Tammadge
1979 Clive W. Kilmister
1980 D A Quadling MA, FIMA, later OBE 
1981 Michael Atiyah
1982 F J Budden BSc 
1983 Rolph Ludwig Edward Schwarzenberger
1984 P B Coaker BSc, ARCS, DIC, FIMA, FBCS 
1985 Hilary Shuard
1986 Anita Straker
1987 Margaret Rayner
1988 A.G. Howson
1989 Mr Peter Reynolds MA 
1990 Margaret Brown
1991 
1992 Mr John Hersee MA 
1993 Dr William Wynne-Wilson BA, PhD 
1994 Mary Bradburn
1995 E. Roy Ashley
1996 W. P. Richardson MBE
1997 Tony Gardiner
1998 Professor J Chris Robson
1999 John S Berry
2000 Mr Stephen Abbott BSc, MSc
2001 Dr Sue Sanders Cert.Ed, BA, MEd, PhD 
2002 Mr Barry Lewis BSc, BA, FIMA 
2003 Christopher Zeeman 
2004 Professor Adam McBride OBE
2005 Sue Singer
2006 Mr Doug French
2007 Rob Eastaway 
2008 Mr Robert Barbour
2009 Mrs Jane Imrie
2010 David Acheson
2011 Dr Paul Andrews
2012 Professor Marcus Du Sautoy OBE FRS
2013 Mr Peter Ransom MBE
2014 Lynne McClure OBE
2015 Dr Peter M. Neumann OBE 
2016 Dr Jennie Golding
2017 Mr Tom Roper
2018 Professor Mike Askew 
2019 Dr Ems Lord 
2020 Professor Hannah Fry
2021 Dr Chris Pritchard
2022 Dr Colin Foster (President)
2023 Professor Nira Chamberlain (President Designate)

Arms

See also
 London Mathematical Society
 Institute of Mathematics and its Applications

References

 
 
 Michael H Price Mathematics of the Multitude? A History of the Mathematical Association (MA, 1994)

External links
 The Mathematical Association website
 Complete list of Presidents of the Association
 The MA's online shop
 Annual conference
 The Mathematical Gazette No. 1, 30, 31, 37–39, 41, 43 (1901–1904) on the Internet Archive digitised by Google from the Harvard University Library

News items
 Addressing the downward spiral of UK maths education in February 2004
 Proposal to split Maths GCSE into two in August 2003

1871 establishments in the United Kingdom
Educational charities based in the United Kingdom
Learned societies of the United Kingdom
Leicester
Mathematics education in the United Kingdom
Mathematical societies
Organisations based in Leicestershire
Organizations established in 1871
Teacher associations based in the United Kingdom